HMS Emulous was a Royal Navy 18-gun Cruizer-class brig-sloop, built by William Row at Newcastle and launched in 1806. She survived an inconclusive but bloody battle with a French frigate during the Napoleonic Wars and captured a number of prizes, including two privateers, on the Halifax station during the War of 1812 before she was wrecked in 1812.

Service
Emulous was commissioned under Commander Gustavus Stupart for convoys and cruising. She sailed with a Halifax convoy on 18 August 1807 and spent in 1808-1809 in American waters.

On 11 April 1807 Emulous and the gun-brig  recaptured Rochdale.

On 9 November 1809 Emulous repelled a French 32-gun frigate off Puerto Rico. The action took place at pistol-shot range and lasted for one hour and 40 minutes. Emulous was badly damaged and lost 10 men killed and 20 wounded before she could escape.

On 10 March 1810, she and  captured the schooner Spitfire. Stupart was made post-captain on 21 October 1810.

In November 1810, Captain William Howe Mulcaster took command. On 25 July 1811, Emulous captured the French letter of marque Adele, which was pierced for 16 guns but only carried two. She had a crew of 35 men and was carrying cotton from Charlestown to Nantes.

11 July: brig Illuminator, of 254 tons, sailing from Havana to Boston with a cargo of molasses, sugar, coffee, and hides;
12 July: schooner Lively, of 78 tons, sailing from St. Bartholomew's to Boston with a cargo of molasses and sugar;
12 July: schooner Traveller, of 108 tons, sailing from Georgia to Alexandria with a cargo of live oak timber;
13 July: ship Maria, of 344 tons, sailing from Cadiz to New York in ballast but carrying dollars;
15 July: brig Cordelia, of 197 tons, sailing from Figuera to Boston with a cargo of fruit and dollars;
16 July: brig Belleisle, of 119 tons, sailing from Havana to Salem with a cargo of molasses, sugar, and coffee; and lastly, together with Spartan,
17 July, Spartan in sight: brig George, of 211 tons, sailing from Messina to Salem with a cargo of wine, brandy, opium, oil, etc.; and
18 July, together with Spartan: schooner Hiram, of 132 tons, sailing from Lisbon to Salem with a cargo of fruit and dollars.

Then on 30 July 1812, after a short chase Emulous captured the American privateer Gossamer, off Cape Sable. Gossamer had a crew of 100 men and 14 guns on carriages, and was under the command of Captain C. Goodrich. She had left Boston on 24 June and had made only one capture, albeit an important one, Mary Jane, of Greenock, which had been sailing from Jamaica to Quebec. Mary Jane was relatively heavily armed for a merchantman as she carried eight 12-pounder carronades and two 6-pounder guns. Her capture netted her American captors $40,000.

Fate
On 2 August 1812  met up with Emulous and reported that an American privateer was said to be sheltering nearby. The two set out together and as they approached the coast Emulous suddenly grounded. During the efforts to get her off, Colibri took off all non-essential crew and the prisoners she had on board. Shortly thereafter Emulous fell over onto her beam-ends and became unsalvageable. Her position was some 19 miles from Cape Sable Island, Nova Scotia.

The subsequent court martial admonished Mulcaster to be more careful in the future. It reprimanded Lieutenant Thomas Fowler, the officer of the watch, for failing to send for the pilot when they came into shallow water. It also severely reprimanded the Master, John Wilson, for not having taken depth soundings during his watch.

Legacy 
 Namesake of Emulous Reef on Ram Island, Lockeport Harbor, Nova Scotia.

Notes, citations, and references
Notes

Citations

References

External links
 Phillips, Michael, Ships of the Old Navy - HMS Emulous

 

Cruizer-class brig-sloops
1806 ships
Ships built on the River Tyne
Maritime incidents in 1812